Opharus rhodosoma is a moth of the family Erebidae. It was described by Arthur Gardiner Butler in 1876. It is found in Ecuador.

References

Opharus
Moths described in 1876
Moths of South America